Eccezzziunale... veramente is a 1982 Italian comedy film directed by Carlo Vanzina. It was shown as part of a retrospective on Italian comedy at the 67th Venice International Film Festival.

Plot
Diego Abatantuono portrays three different parts as a supporter of the three main football teams of Italy: A.C. Milan, Internazionale and Juventus.

The three characters are: Donato Cavallo (A.C. Milan supporter), the chief of the hooligans of the southern stand in San Siro stadium; Franco Alfano, Inter supporter who believes he won the football lottery, but it's just a prank made by his friends; Tirzan, Juventus supporter, is a truck driver from Apulia, who decided to follow his beloved team to Belgium for a European Cup game.

Cast

 Diego Abatantuono as Donato Cavallo / Franco Alfano / Felice La Pezza, aka "Tirzan"
 Massimo Boldi as Massimo
 Teo Teocoli as Teo
 Stefania Sandrelli as Loredana
 Yorgo Voyagis as "The Slav"
 Ugo Conti as Ugo
 Anna Melato as Franco's Wife
 Gianfranco Barra as Inspector Patanè
 Clara Colosimo as Franco's mother-in-law
 Renzo Ozzano as a Parisian Inspector
 Renato D'Amore as Sandrino 
 Franco Caraccioloas a Hitchhiker 
 Enio Drovandi as a Policeman 
 Guido Nicheli as a Man at a bar
 Franca Scagnetti as La Monica's Wife

References

External links

1982 films
1980s sports comedy films
Films directed by Carlo Vanzina
Films scored by Detto Mariano
Italian sports comedy films
1980s Italian-language films
Italian association football films
Films set in Milan
1980s Italian films